Daphne Helen Slater (3 March 1928 – 4 October 2012) was an English actress noted for Shakespearean and period films.

Biography
She was born in London and educated at Haberdashers' Aske's School for Girls, when it was in Acton, before attending the Royal Academy of Dramatic Art, where she won the academy's gold medal.

Frequently lavished with praise by Kenneth Tynan, the most influential critic of his day, Slater divided her career between Shakespearean roles and appearances in television plays. After leaving RADA with a Gold Medal, she was snapped up by the film director Herbert Wilcox, who gave her a seven-year contract and a leading role in The Courtneys of Curzon Street (1947) and she played major screen parts in dozens of television dramas and novel adaptations, including the role of Queen Mary I in the 1971 BBC TV serial Elizabeth R opposite Glenda Jackson.

Death
Slater died on 4 October 2012, aged 84. She was predeceased by her brother and her second husband. She was survived by her first husband John Harrison (born 1924), film/television actor, director and producer and their two sons, Stephen and William.

Roles
 The Courtneys of Curzon Street (1947) .... Cynthia Carmody
 Emma (1948) (TV) .... Harriet Smith
 Pride and Prejudice (1952) (TV miniseries) .... Elizabeth Bennet
 Romeo and Juliet (1954) Stratford-upon-Avon RSC Theatre ... Rosalind
 Jane Eyre (1956) (TV) .... Jane Eyre
 Precious Bane (1957) TV series .... Prue Sarn
 BBC Sunday Night Theatre ("Berkeley Square"; 1959) (TV) .... Helen Pettigrew
 The Burning Glass (1960) TV episode .... Mary Terriford
 ITV Play of the Week .... Mary Terriford (1 episode, 1960)
 Persuasion (1960) (TV miniseries) .... Anne Elliot
 Armchair Theatre ("Nothing to Pay"; 1962) TV episode
 Our Man at St Mark's TV series
 Out of the Unknown ("Stranger in the Family"; 1965) TV episode .... Margaret Wilson
 The Wednesday Play .... Stella Forty (2 episodes, 1964–66)
 The Big Breaker (1964) TV episode .... Sybil
 Jackanory (5 episodes, 1967; see below):
 The Little White Horse: Part 5 ("Out of the Sea"; 1967) ... Storyteller
 The Little White Horse: Part 4 ("The Castle in the Pinewoods"; 1967) ... Storyteller
 The Little White Horse: Part 3 ("The Iron Sword"; 1967) .... Storyteller
 The Little White Horse: Part 2 ("The Ghost of Sir Wrolf"; 1967) ... Storyteller
 The Little White Horse: Part 1 ("The Merryweathers of Moonacre"; 1967) ... Storyteller
 The Jazz Age ("Black Exchange"; 1968) TV episode .... Miss Crowe
 Callan ("Jack-on-Top"; 1969) TV episode .... Stella Paxton
 The Gold Robbers ("Account Rendered"; 1969) TV episode .... Mrs. Oscroft
 W. Somerset Maugham ("Virtue"; 1970) TV episode .... Margery Bishop
 Play for Today ("I Can't See My Little Willie"; 1970) TV episode .... Mary Palmer
 Elizabeth R (1971) (TV miniseries) .... Mary I
 Thirty-Minute Theatre ("Footprints"; 1971) TV episode
 ITV Playhouse ([Love Affair"; 1974) TV episode
 Shadows ("The Future Ghost"; 1975) TV episode .... Mrs. Butler

References

External links
 

1928 births
2012 deaths
English television actresses
English film actresses
Actresses from London
Alumni of RADA
20th-century English actresses
People educated at Haberdashers' Girls' School
20th-century British businesspeople